The women's 100 metres hurdles event at the 2015 African Games was held on 13 and 14 September.

Medalists

Results

Heats
Qualification: First 3 in each heat (Q) and the next 2 fastest (q) advanced to the final.

Wind:Heat 1: +0.2 m/s, Heat 2: 0.0 m/s

Final
Wind: -0.1 m/s

References

100
2015 in women's athletics